Munir Nadir (1946 — 2016) was a notable Pakistani film actor. He died at the age of 70.

References

Pakistani male film actors
1946 births
2016 deaths